Joseph Parry (1744–1826) was a British artist, born in Liverpool in 1744.

The son of a master-pilot, he was apprenticed to a ship and house painter in Liverpool, but during the intervals of his work he devoted himself to the study of art, and when out of his time began practising as a professional artist. In 1790 he moved to Manchester, where he was fortunate in finding appreciative patrons. He continued to reside at Manchester till his death in 1826, when he left four sons, two of whom later practised as artists in their own right.

Parry had considerable practice as a portrait-painter, and painted some large historical compositions in the style then in fashion, together with pictures of shipping and landscapes. He etched an excellent half-length portrait of himself seated at an easel. Only ten impressions were taken of this.

However, Parry's best pictures are familiar scenes of everyday life, such as The Old Market Place and Shambles at Manchester, a small, highly finished oil painting, full of figures, and the Old Bridge, Manchester. He also painted Eccles Wakes, as a private commission for a Liverpool gentleman which contained two hundred figures, all separate studies from nature.

References 

1744 births
1826 deaths
Artists from Liverpool